Duncan Birmingham is a writer, director, and actor living in Los Angeles. He is currently a consultant and writer on Maron on IFC and a writer and co-executive producer on Blunt Talk. In 2021, he released a short story collection, The Cult in My Garage from Maudlin House.

Career
Birmingham started his career as a Rolling Stone intern. Later, he was a reporter and editor for various Boston-area newspapers including The Cambridge Chronicle and the Somerville Journal. He was also a reporter and Bigfoot expert for the Weekly World News.

His fiction has appeared in over a dozen literary magazines like nerve.com, Storychord, Opium, Word Riot and the Oxford Review. He is the author of the blog and subsequent humor book series, Pets Who Want To Kill Themselves.

After moving to Los Angeles, Birmingham worked as a writers' assistant on Queer as Folk before breaking into feature films. He wrote screenplays for Marc Platt Productions, A Thousand Words productions and his spec screenplay Swingles sold to Paramount and was later on The Black List two years in a row. He then transitioned to TV and has sold projects to ABC and Sony.

In 2011, he and Marc Maron wrote a pilot presentation based on Maron's life that screened in NYC and is the basis for the series Maron on IFC. Birmingham serves as a writer and executive producer on the show. Birmingham served as a writer and executive producer on the show for two seasons and a writer and consultant for seasons three and four.

Birmingham is now co-executive producer on Blunt Talk. He also served as a writer on the David Fincher HBO project, Videosynchrzy. His project Foodies is in development at AMC with Michael London producing.

Birmingham has written, directed or acted in projects that have played at the Sundance Film Festival, AFI, Gen Art, SXSW, New York TV Festival, Williamstown Film Festival, Catalina Festival, Los Angeles Short Film Festival, LA Indie Film Festival; among others.

His adventurous food group has been chronicled by LA Weekly.

References

American directors
American male film actors
Living people
Year of birth missing (living people)
American male writers